Haralambos (Babis) Tsertos (Greek: Μπάμπης Τσέρτος; born October 27, 1956) is a Greek musician. His sister is the singer Nadia Karagianni and his father was also a musician who played the mandolin. At the age of 17, he settled permanently in Athens and in 1974, he entered the Faculty of Physics at the National and Kapodistrian University of Athens.

Early years

As a student he studied playing the Bouzouki and participated in the University music band singing entexno, rebetiko and folk songs. In 1980, he started to work as a professional, singing at the tavern "Oi filoi" ("The Friends") at Kypseli, Athens.

Collaborations

Since then, he has worked with great Greek artists, such as Sotiria Bellou, Takis Binis, Anna Chrysafi, Keti Gray, Kostas Kaplanis, Theodoros Polykandriotis, Koulis Skarpelis, Hondronakos, as well as with recent years singers such as Babis Goles, Giorgos Xindaris, Stelios Vamvakaris, Mario, Agathonas Iakovidis, Glykeria, Manolis Mitsias, Vicky Moscholiou, Lakis Halkias, Petros Vagiopoulos, Eleni Vitali, George Dalaras, Pantelis Thalassinos, Nadia Karagianni, Chronis Aidonidis, Theodosia Stiga, Sotiria Leonardou, and others.

In the recent years he is also cooperating with the Mandolin Orchestra of Exarchia "Dionisios Lavragas", which has given a series of concerts in many theaters and at the National Opera of Greece, with great lyrical artists. The culmination of this cooperation was his participation at the album "Diadromes" (music by Christos Nikolopoulos, lyrics by Fontas Ladis), that refers at the neighborhoods of Athens and is a live recording from the concert of the Mandolin Orchestra in the National Opera.

Awards

In 2002, he won the award for the best singer of rebetiko at the "Corfu Awards" and in 2003, the award for the best folk album for "Anaglifa mias tehnis tapinis" at the "Arion Awards". He has also cooperated with the orchestra "Estudiantina" of Nea Ionia (Volos, Greece), presenting the great musical richness of the folk songs from Smyrne. He also participated in the album "Smyrne" of Estudiantina, that was released in 2003 as a production of George Dalaras with the participation of many great singers, that won the award for the best traditional album at the "Arion Awards".

Discography
Babis Tsertos has 9 personal albums as well as several participations in other albums.

Personal albums
1993 - Atimi tihi
1996 - Erotopoulion
1998 - Ta niata ta berbandika
1999 - To meraklidiko pouli
2000 - Tis ligeris apenanti
2002 - Anaglifa mias tehnis tapinis
2006 - To monopati
2008 - O Babis Tsertos tragouda Mihali Souyioul (Babis Tsertos sings Mihalis Souyioul)
2010 - I girologi (Book + CD)
2010 - Stou paradisou to vitho

Participations
1988 - Babis Goles 6
1992 - Ellada stin iyia sou
1993 - I veterani tou rempetikou (The veterans of Rebetiko)
1995 - Tragoudopiion i orea Ellas
1995 - Me mia ombrela tripia
1996 - I rimes tis agapis
1996 - Me ti fora tou anemou
1997 - Gia sou kir-isagelea
1999 - I topi tis kardias mou
1999 - Drosostalida
2001 - Ta fantaristika
2001 - Saranta hronia tragoudia ke moussikes(Forty years of songs and music)
2002 - Ta Arkadika
2002 - Diadromes
2003 - Paravasis
2003 - Egeo
2003 - Smyrne
2003 - Xigimena ke parexigimena
2005 - Isovia
2006 - I Estudiadina parousiazi tin orhistra laikon organon "Odissos"
2006 - Spai to rodi
2007 - Laika fegaria
2007 - To telefteo mou tsigaro
2008 - Tragoudia me ousies
2008 - Attik - Tribute
2008 - Handra-Handra tragoudo
2009 - Panigiri sto Pertouli
2009 - Sta monopatia tis paradosis
2009 - Me ton Obama adama
2009 - Na ta poume?
2011 - Gerapetros - Traditional Songs & Carols from Crete
2011 - Carmina Graeca
2011 - Stou hronou tis katapaktes
2011 - Dose mou mia spitha ap' to fili sou
2011 - Osa hronia ki an perasoun

Collections
Personal Collections
2005 - Deka hronia tragoudia (10 years songs)
2007 - Glenti me ton Tserto

Collections of the "Rebetiki Tetras" (Glykeria, Agathonas Iakovidis, Babis Tsertos, Babis Goles)
1997 - Pino ke metho
1998 - Me paresire to rema
2003 - Tis gerakinas gios
2004 - Arhisan ta organa

Sources
 "Guide of Hellenic Discography", by Petros Dragoumanos

External links
 Official website

1956 births
20th-century Greek male singers
Greek entehno singers
Greek laïko singers
Greek rebetiko singers
Living people
People from Arcadia, Peloponnese